Sunil Raoh (born 4 September 1978) is a Kannada cinema actor from India. He is also a seasoned singer and lyricist who has performed for few Kannada film songs. He has acted in numerous films as a child artist and also featured in a few television series.

Personal life and family
Sunil Rao comes from a family of well-known musicians. His mother B. K. Sumitra, is a prominent Sugama Sangeetha (light music) singer. His sister Sowmya Raoh is also an established playback singer who has performed for various films in different languages. He was also interested in playback-singing and entered the film industry aspiring to be one. But he had to change his path towards acting since offers came pouring ever since he was a child. He studied in Bangalore's National College.

Career

As a child artist
Rao started his career as a child artiste in the year 1987 for the films such as Kendada Male and Elu Suttina Kote. He performed his roles much to the attention of producers and went on acting in a few more films.

Television artist
Rao, aspiring to be a playback singer, re-entered acting in his teens. He appeared in a few soap operas that included Janani, Chaduranga, Punarjanma, B. Suresh's Sadhane and T. N. Seetharam's Manvantara and Bhageerathi. In Janani, he was cast as the grandson of Bharathi Vishnuvardhan's character.

Films
Sunil Rao began his film career acting in some non-significant character roles in the films such as Chitra and Panchaalee. However, he shot to fame in the 2003 released Hinglish film Freaky Chakra. He starred alongside Deepti Naval as a young boy infatuated by an older woman. He also starred as a teenage lover in the Kavita Lankesh directorial Preethi Prema Pranaya opposite Anu Prabhakar, the same year. Then came his most successful Kannada film Excuse Me (2003) where he played an anti-hero character alongside Ajay Rao and Ramya.

In 2005, he starred in a series of unsuccessful films like Chappale, Masala and Sakha Sakhi. The latter was a remake of the Tamil hit Thiruda Thirudi. Most of his films during this time featured him alongside other male lead characters. Sakha Sakhi was an exception to this. In 2006, he starred in the critically acclaimed Belli Betta directed by Shivaraj Hoskere. He also appeared as one of the lead characters in the film Jackpot.

Following these ventures, Rao became choosy and featured in very few films in the late 2000s. His only release in 2008 was his cameo appearance in the film Tajmahal. Minugu opposite Pooja Gandhi was his solo release in the year 2010. Noted film maker Sunil Kumar Desai announced a film called Sarigama in 2008 with Rao and Prajwal Devaraj in the lead. This film, expected to have a 2012 release got shelved due to unknown reasons.

Reports of him coming back to acting after a hiatus made news with his longtime associate director announcing his project called Bangalore Calling. It reported that Sunil would play one of the three main lead roles.

Filmography

Web series

Awards
He has been awarded the 'Roopakala Belli Kanmani Award' as a 'Naada shreshta Kalavida' by the 'Roopakala Utsava-25' linked with the Karnataka State in the year 2011

References

External links 
 

Male actors in Kannada cinema
Indian male film actors
Living people
1978 births
Indian male child actors
20th-century Indian male actors
21st-century Indian male actors